Liberal democracy or  western democracy is the combination of a liberal political ideology that operates under a representative democratic form of government. It is characterized by elections between multiple distinct political parties, a separation of powers into different branches of government, the rule of law in everyday life as part of an open society, a market economy with private property, and the equal protection of human rights, civil rights, civil liberties and political freedoms for all people. To define the system in practice, liberal democracies often draw upon a constitution, either codified  or uncodified, to delineate the powers of government and enshrine the social contract. After a period of expansion in the second half of the 20th century, liberal democracy became a prevalent political system in the world.

A liberal democracy may take various and mixed constitutional forms: it may be a constitutional monarchy (Australia, Belgium, Canada, Japan, Norway, Spain and the United Kingdom) or a republic (France, India, Ireland, the United States). It may have a parliamentary system (Australia, Canada, India, Ireland, the United Kingdom), a presidential system (Indonesia, the United States), or a semi-presidential system (France).  

Liberal democracies usually have universal suffrage, granting all adult citizens the right to vote regardless of ethnicity, sex, property ownership, race, age, sexuality, gender, income, social status, or religion. However, historically some countries regarded as liberal democracies have had a more limited franchise. Even today, some countries, considered to be liberal democracies, do not have truly universal suffrage. For instance, in the United Kingdom people serving long prison sentences are unable to vote, a policy which has been ruled a human rights violation by the European Court of Human Rights. A similar policy is also enacted in most of the United States. According to a study by Coppedge and Reinicke, at least 85% of democracies provided for universal suffrage. Many nations require positive identification before allowing people to vote. For example, in the United States 2/3 of states require their citizens to provide identification to vote, these states also provide state IDs for free. The decisions made through elections are made not by all of the citizens but rather by those who are members of the electorate and who choose to participate by voting.

The liberal democratic constitution defines the democratic character of the state. The purpose of a constitution is often seen as a limit on the authority of the government. Liberal democracy emphasizes the separation of powers, an independent judiciary and a system of checks and balances between branches of government. Multi-party systems with at least two persistent, viable political parties are characteristic of liberal democracies. In Europe, liberal democracies are likely to emphasize the importance of the state being a Rechtsstaat, i.e. a state that follows the principle of rule of law. Governmental authority is legitimately exercised only in accordance with written, publicly disclosed laws adopted and enforced in accordance with established procedure. Many democracies use federalism, also known as vertical separation of powers, in order to prevent abuse and increase public input by dividing governing powers between municipal, provincial and national governments (e.g. Germany, where the federal government assumes the main legislative responsibilities and the federated Länder assume many executive tasks).

Origins 

Liberal democracy traces its origins—and its name—to the European 18th-century, also known as the Age of Enlightenment. At the time, the vast majority of European states were monarchies, with political power held either by the monarch or the aristocracy. The possibility of democracy had not been a seriously considered political theory since classical antiquity and the widely held belief was that democracies would be inherently unstable and chaotic in their policies due to the changing whims of the people. It was further believed that democracy was contrary to human nature, as human beings were seen to be inherently evil, violent and in need of a strong leader to restrain their destructive impulses. Many European monarchs held that their power had been ordained by God and that questioning their right to rule was tantamount to blasphemy.

These conventional views were challenged at first by a relatively small group of Enlightenment intellectuals, who believed that human affairs should be guided by reason and principles of liberty and equality. They argued that all people are created equal and therefore political authority cannot be justified on the basis of "noble blood", a supposed privileged connection to God or any other characteristic that is alleged to make one person superior to others. They further argued that governments exist to serve the people—not vice versa—and that laws should apply to those who govern as well as to the governed (a concept known as rule of law).

Some of these ideas began to be expressed in England in the 17th century. There was renewed interest in Magna Carta, and passage of the Petition of Right in 1628 and Habeas Corpus Act in 1679 established certain liberties for subjects. The idea of a political party took form with groups debating rights to political representation during the Putney Debates of 1647. After the English Civil Wars (1642–1651) and the Glorious Revolution of 1688, the Bill of Rights was enacted in 1689, which codified certain rights and liberties. The Bill set out the requirement for regular elections, rules for freedom of speech in Parliament and limited the power of the monarch, ensuring that, unlike almost all of Europe at the time, royal absolutism would not prevail. This led to significant social change in Britain in terms of the position of individuals in society and the growing power of Parliament in relation to the monarch.

By the late 18th century, leading philosophers of the day had published works that spread around the European continent and beyond. One of the most influential of these philosophers was English empiricist John Locke, who refuted monarchical absolutism in his Two Treatises of Government. According to Locke, individuals entered into a social contract with a state, surrendering some of their liberties in exchange for the protection of their natural rights. Locke advanced that governments were only legitimate if they maintained the consent of the governed and that citizens had the right to instigate a rebellion against their government if that government acted against their interests. These ideas and beliefs influenced the American Revolution and the French Revolution, which gave birth to the ideology of liberalism and instituted forms of government that attempted to put the principles of the Enlightenment philosophers into practice.  

When the first prototypical liberal democracies were founded, the liberals themselves were viewed as an extreme and rather dangerous fringe group that threatened international peace and stability. The conservative monarchists who opposed liberalism and democracy saw themselves as defenders of traditional values and the natural order of things and their criticism of democracy seemed vindicated when Napoleon Bonaparte took control of the young French Republic, reorganized it into the first French Empire and proceeded to conquer most of Europe. Napoleon was eventually defeated and the Holy Alliance was formed in Europe to prevent any further spread of liberalism or democracy. However, liberal democratic ideals soon became widespread among the general population and over the 19th century traditional monarchy was forced on a continuous defensive and withdrawal. The dominions of the British Empire became laboratories for liberal democracy from the mid 19th century onward. In Canada, responsible government began in the 1840s and in Australia and New Zealand, parliamentary government elected by male suffrage and secret ballot was established from the 1850s and female suffrage achieved from the 1890s.

Reforms and revolutions helped move most European countries towards liberal democracy. Liberalism ceased being a fringe opinion and joined the political mainstream. At the same time, a number of non-liberal ideologies developed that took the concept of liberal democracy and made it their own. The political spectrum changed; traditional monarchy became more and more a fringe view and liberal democracy became more and more mainstream. By the end of the 19th century, liberal democracy was no longer only a "liberal" idea, but an idea supported by many different ideologies. After World War I and especially after World War II, liberal democracy achieved a dominant position among theories of government and is now endorsed by the vast majority of the political spectrum.

Although liberal democracy was originally put forward by Enlightenment liberals, the relationship between democracy and liberalism has been controversial since the beginning and was problematized in the 20th century. In his book Freedom and Equality in a Liberal Democratic State, Jasper Doomen posited that freedom and equality are necessary for a liberal democracy. In his book The End of History and the Last Man, Francis Fukuyama says that since the French Revolution, liberal democracy has repeatedly proven to be a fundamentally better system (ethically, politically, economically) than any of the alternatives, and that democracy will become more and more prevalent in the long term, although it may suffer "temporary" setbacks. The research institute Freedom House today simply defines liberal democracy as an electoral democracy also protecting civil liberties.

Rights and freedoms 
In practice, democracies do have limits on certain freedoms. There are various legal limitations such as copyright and laws against defamation. There may be limits on anti-democratic speech, on attempts to undermine human rights and on the promotion or justification of terrorism. In the United States more than in Europe, during the Cold War such restrictions applied to communists. Now they are more commonly applied to organizations perceived as promoting terrorism or the incitement of group hatred. Examples include anti-terrorism legislation, the shutting down of Hezbollah satellite broadcasts and some laws against hate speech. Critics claim that these limitations may go too far and that there may be no due and fair judicial process. The common justification for these limits is that they are necessary to guarantee the existence of democracy, or the existence of the freedoms themselves. For example, allowing free speech for those advocating mass murder undermines the right to life and security. Opinion is divided on how far democracy can extend to include the enemies of democracy in the democratic process. If relatively small numbers of people are excluded from such freedoms for these reasons, a country may still be seen as a liberal democracy. Some argue that this is only quantitatively (not qualitatively) different from autocracies that persecute opponents, since only a small number of people are affected and the restrictions are less severe, but others emphasize that democracies are different. At least in theory, opponents of democracy are also allowed due process under the rule of law.

Governments considered to be democratic may impose restrictions of free speech. Examples include restrictions related to Holocaust denial and hate speech. 

In some countries, members of political organizations with connections to historical totalitarian governments (for example formerly predominant communist, fascist or Nazi governments in some European countries) may be deprived of the vote and the privilege of holding certain jobs. 

Some discriminatory behavior may be prohibited. Some examples include: 
 Public accommodations in the United States may not discriminate on the basis of "race, color, religion, or national origin." 
 In Canada, a printer who refused to print materials for the Canadian Lesbian and Gay Archives was fined $5,000, incurred $100,000 in legal fees and was ordered to pay a further $40,000 of his opponents' legal fees by the Human Rights Tribunal.

In some cases, rights considered fundamental in one country may be foreign to other governments.
 The constitutions of Canada, India, Israel, Mexico and the United States guarantee freedom from double jeopardy, a right not provided in some other legal systems. 
 Legal systems that use politically elected court jurors, such as Sweden, view a (partly) politicized court system as a main component of accountable government. Other democracies employ trial by jury with the intent of shielding against the influence of politicians over trials. 

In some cases, rights considered fundamental by some members of that country may be not be considered fundamental by other other members of that country.
 Some Americans interpret the Second Amendment to the United States Constitution ("A well regulated Militia, being necessary to the security of a free State, the right of the people to keep and bear Arms, shall not be infringed.") as creating a fundamental right for an individual. Some Americans disagree with this interpretation.

In 1971, Robert Dahl summarized the fundamental rights and freedoms shared by all liberal democracies as eight rights:

 Freedom to form and join organizations.
 Freedom of expression.
 Right to vote.
 Right to run for public office.
 Right of political leaders to compete for support and votes.
 Freedom of alternative sources of information
 Free and fair elections.
 Right to control government policy through votes and other expressions of preference.

Preconditions 
For a political regime to be considered a liberal democracy it must contain in its governing over a nation-state the provision of civil rights- the non-discrimination in the provision of public goods such as justice, security, education and health- in addition to, political rights- the guarantee of free and fair electoral contests, which allow the winners of such contests to determine policy subject to the constraints established by other rights, when these are provided- and property rights- which protect asset holders and investors against expropriation by the state or other groups. In this way, liberal democracy is set apart from electoral democracy, as free and fair elections – the hallmark of electoral democracy – can be separated from equal treatment and non-discrimination – the hallmarks of liberal democracy. In liberal democracy, an elected government cannot discriminate against specific individuals or groups when it administers justice, protects basic rights such as freedom of assembly and free speech, provides for collective security, or distributes economic and social benefits. 
According to Seymour Martin Lipset, although they are not part of the system of government as such, a modicum of individual and economic freedoms, which result in the formation of a significant middle class and a broad and flourishing civil society, are seen as pre-conditions for liberal democracy.

For countries without a strong tradition of democratic majority rule, the introduction of free elections alone has rarely been sufficient to achieve a transition from dictatorship to democracy; a wider shift in the political culture and gradual formation of the institutions of democratic government are needed. There are various examples—for instance, in Latin America—of countries that were able to sustain democracy only temporarily or in a limited fashion until wider cultural changes established the conditions under which democracy could flourish.

One of the key aspects of democratic culture is the concept of a "loyal opposition", where political competitors may disagree, but they must tolerate one another and acknowledge the legitimate and important roles that each play. This is an especially difficult cultural shift to achieve in nations where transitions of power have historically taken place through violence. The term means in essence that all sides in a democracy share a common commitment to its basic values. The ground rules of the society must encourage tolerance and civility in public debate. In such a society, the losers accept the judgement of the voters when the election is over and allow for the peaceful transfer of power. According to Cas Mudde and Cristóbal Rovira Kaltwasser, this is tied to another key concept of democratic cultures, the protection of minorities, where the losers are safe in the knowledge that they will neither lose their lives nor their liberty and will continue to participate in public life. They are loyal not to the specific policies of the government, but to the fundamental legitimacy of the state and to the democratic process itself.

One requirement of liberal democracy is political equality amongst voters (ensuring that all voices and all votes count equally) and that these can properly influence government policy, requiring quality procedure and quality content of debate that provides an accountable result, this may apply within elections or to procedures between elections. This requires universal, adult suffrage; recurring, free elections, competitive and fair elections; multiple political parties and a wide variety of information so that citizens can rationally and effectively put pressure onto the government, including that it can be checked, evaluated and removed. This can include or lead to accountability, responsiveness to the desires of citizens, the rule of law, full respect of rights and implementation of political, social and economic freedom. Other liberal democracies consider the requirement of minority rights and preventing tyranny of the majority. One of the most common ways is by actively preventing discrimination by the government (bill of rights) but can also include requiring concurrent majorities in several constituencies (confederalism); guaranteeing regional government (federalism); broad coalition governments (consociationalism) or negotiating with other political actors, such as pressure groups (neocorporatism). These split political power amongst many competing and cooperating actors and institutions by requiring the government to respect minority groups and give them their positive freedoms, negotiate across multiple geographical areas, become more centrist among cooperative parties and open up with new social groups.

Liberal democracies around the world 

Several organizations and political scientists maintain lists of free and unfree states, both in the present and going back a couple centuries. Of these, the best known may be the Polity Data Set and that produced by Freedom House and Larry Diamond.

There is agreement amongst several intellectuals and organizations such as Freedom House that the states of the European Union (with the exception of Poland and Hungary), United Kingdom, Norway, Iceland, Switzerland, Japan, Argentina, Brazil, Chile, South Korea, Taiwan, the United States, India, Canada, Uruguay, Costa Rica, Israel, South Africa, Australia and New Zealand are liberal democracies, with India currently having the largest population among the democracies in the world.

Liberal democracies are susceptible to democratic backsliding and this is taking place or has taken place in several countries, including, but not limited to, the United States, Poland and Hungary.

Freedom House considers many of the officially democratic governments in Africa and the former Soviet Union to be undemocratic in practice, usually because the sitting government has a strong influence over election outcomes. Many of these countries are in a state of considerable flux.

Officially non-democratic forms of government, such as single-party states and dictatorships, are more common in East Asia, the Middle East and North Africa.

The 2019 Freedom in the World report noted a fall in the number of countries with liberal democracies over the 13 years from 2005 to 2018, citing declines in 'political rights and civil liberties'. The 2020  and 2021  reports document further reductions in the number of "free" countries in the world.

Types

Proportional vs. plurality representation 
Plurality voting system award seats according to regional majorities. The political party or individual candidate who receives the most votes, wins the seat which represents that locality. There are other democratic electoral systems, such as the various forms of proportional representation, which award seats according to the proportion of individual votes that a party receives nationwide or in a particular region.

One of the main points of contention between these two systems is whether to have representatives who are able to effectively represent specific regions in a country, or to have all citizens' vote count the same, regardless of where in the country they happen to live.

Some countries, such as Germany and New Zealand, address the conflict between these two forms of representation by having two categories of seats in the lower house of their national legislative bodies. The first category of seats is appointed according to regional popularity and the remainder are awarded to give the parties a proportion of seats that is equal—or as equal as practicable—to their proportion of nationwide votes. This system is commonly called mixed member proportional representation.

The Australian Government incorporates both systems in having the preferential voting system applicable to the lower house and proportional representation by state in the upper house. This system is argued to result in a more stable government, while having a better diversity of parties to review its actions. The various state and territory governments in Australia employ a range of a different electoral systems.

Presidential vs. parliamentary systems 
A presidential system is a system of government of a republic in which the executive branch is elected separately from the legislative. A parliamentary system is distinguished by the executive branch of government being dependent on the direct or indirect support of the parliament, often expressed through a vote of confidence.

The presidential system of democratic government has been adopted in Latin America, Africa and parts of the former Soviet Union, largely by the example of the United States. Constitutional monarchies (dominated by elected parliaments) are present in Northern Europe and some former colonies which peacefully separated, such as Australia and Canada. Others have also arisen in Spain, East Asia and a variety of small nations around the world. Former British territories such as South Africa, India, Ireland and the United States opted for different forms at the time of independence. The parliamentary system is widely used in the European Union and neighbouring countries.

Impact on economic growth 

Recent academic studies have found that democratisation is beneficial for national growth. However, the effect of democratisation has not been studied as yet. The most common factors that determine whether a country’s economy grows or not are the country’s level of development and the educational level of its newly elected democratic leaders. As a result, there is no clear indication of how to determine which factors contribute to economic growth in a democratic country.

However, there is disagreement regarding how much credit the democratic system can take for this growth. One observation is that democracy became widespread only after the Industrial Revolution and the introduction of capitalism. On the other hand, the Industrial Revolution started in England which was one of the most democratic nations for its time within its own borders, but this democracy was very limited and did not apply to the colonies which contributed significantly to the wealth.

Several statistical studies support the theory that a higher degree of economic freedom, as measured with one of the several Indices of Economic Freedom which have been used in numerous studies, increases economic growth and that this in turn increases general prosperity, reduces poverty and causes democratisation. This is a statistical tendency and there are individual exceptions like Mali, which is ranked as "Free" by Freedom House, but is a Least Developed Country, or Qatar, which has arguably the highest GDP per capita in the world, but has never been democratic. There are also other studies suggesting that more democracy increases economic freedom, although a few find no or even a small negative effect.

Some argue that economic growth due to its empowerment of citizens will ensure a transition to democracy in countries such as Cuba. However, other dispute this and even if economic growth has caused democratisation in the past, it may not do so in the future. Dictators may now have learned how to have economic growth without this causing more political freedom.

A high degree of oil or mineral exports is strongly associated with nondemocratic rule. This effect applies worldwide and not only to the Middle East. Dictators who have this form of wealth can spend more on their security apparatus and provide benefits which lessen public unrest. Also, such wealth is not followed by the social and cultural changes that may transform societies with ordinary economic growth.

A 2006 meta-analysis found that democracy has no direct effect on economic growth. However, it has strong and significant indirect effects which contribute to growth. Democracy is associated with higher human capital accumulation, lower inflation, lower political instability and higher economic freedom. There is also some evidence that it is associated with larger governments and more restrictions on international trade.

If leaving out East Asia, then during the last forty-five years poor democracies have grown their economies 50% more rapidly than nondemocracies. Poor democracies such as the Baltic countries, Botswana, Costa Rica, Ghana and Senegal have grown more rapidly than nondemocracies such as Angola, Syria, Uzbekistan and Zimbabwe.

Of the eighty worst financial catastrophes during the last four decades, only five were in democracies. Similarly, poor democracies are half likely as nondemocracies to experience a 10 percent decline in GDP per capita over the course of a single year.

Justification

Political stability 
The political stability of liberal democracies depends on strong economic growth, as well as robust state institutions that guarantee free elections, the rule of law, and individual liberties.

One argument for democracy is that by creating a system where the public can remove administrations, without changing the legal basis for government, democracy aims at reducing political uncertainty and instability and assuring citizens that however much they may disagree with present policies, they will be given a regular chance to change those who are in power, or change policies with which they disagree. This is preferable to a system where political change takes place through violence.

One notable feature of liberal democracies is that their opponents (those groups who wish to abolish liberal democracy) rarely win elections. Advocates use this as an argument to support their view that liberal democracy is inherently stable and can usually only be overthrown by external force, while opponents argue that the system is inherently stacked against them despite its claims to impartiality. In the past, it was feared that democracy could be easily exploited by leaders with dictatorial aspirations, who could get themselves elected into power. However, the actual number of liberal democracies that have elected dictators into power is low. When it has occurred, it is usually after a major crisis has caused many people to doubt the system or in young/poorly functioning democracies. Some possible examples include Adolf Hitler during the Great Depression and Napoleon III, who became first President of the Second French Republic and later Emperor.

Effective response in wartime 
By definition, a liberal democracy implies that power is not concentrated. One criticism is that this could be a disadvantage for a state in wartime, when a fast and unified response is necessary. The legislature usually must give consent before the start of an offensive military operation, although sometimes the executive can do this on its own while keeping the legislature informed. If the democracy is attacked, then no consent is usually required for defensive operations. The people may vote against a conscription army.

However, actual research shows that democracies are more likely to win wars than non-democracies. One explanation attributes this primarily to "the transparency of the polities, and the stability of their preferences, once determined, democracies are better able to cooperate with their partners in the conduct of wars". Other research attributes this to superior mobilisation of resources or selection of wars that the democratic states have a high chance of winning.

Stam and Reiter also note that the emphasis on individuality within democratic societies means that their soldiers fight with greater initiative and superior leadership. Officers in dictatorships are often selected for political loyalty rather than military ability. They may be exclusively selected from a small class or religious/ethnic group that support the regime. The leaders in nondemocracies may respond violently to any perceived criticisms or disobedience. This may make the soldiers and officers afraid to raise any objections or do anything without explicit authorisation. The lack of initiative may be particularly detrimental in modern warfare. Enemy soldiers may more easily surrender to democracies since they can expect comparatively good treatment. In contrast, Nazi Germany killed almost 2/3 of the captured Soviet soldiers and 38% of the American soldiers captured by North Korea in the Korean War were killed.

Better information on and corrections of problems 
A democratic system may provide better information for policy decisions. Undesirable information may more easily be ignored in dictatorships, even if this undesirable or contrarian information provides early warning of problems. Anders Chydenius put forward the argument for freedom of the press for this reason in 1776. The democratic system also provides a way to replace inefficient leaders and policies, thus problems may continue longer and crises of all kinds may be more common in autocracies.

Reduction of Corruption 

Research by the World Bank suggests that political institutions are extremely important in determining the prevalence of corruption: (long term) democracy, parliamentary systems, political stability and freedom of the press are all associated with lower corruption. Freedom of information legislation is important for accountability and transparency. The Indian Right to Information Act "has already engendered mass movements in the country that is bringing the lethargic, often corrupt bureaucracy to its knees and changing power equations completely".

Famines and refugees 
Prominent economist Amartya Sen has noted that no functioning democracy has ever suffered a large scale famine. Refugee crises almost always occur in non-democracies. From 1985 to 2008, the eighty-seven largest refugee crises occurred in autocracies.

Human development 
Democracy correlates with a higher score on the Human Development Index and a lower score on the human poverty index.

Democracies have the potential to put in place better education, longer life expectancy, lower infant mortality, access to drinking water and better health care than dictatorships. This is not due to higher levels of foreign assistance or spending a larger percentage of GDP on health and education, as instead the available resources are managed better.

Several health indicators (life expectancy and infant and maternal mortality) have a stronger and more significant association with democracy than they have with GDP per capita, rise of the public sector or income inequality.

In the post-communist nations, after an initial decline those that are the most democratic have achieved the greatest gains in life expectancy.

Democratic peace theory 

Numerous studies using many different kinds of data, definitions and statistical analyses have found support for the democratic peace theory. The original finding was that liberal democracies have never made war with one another. More recent research has extended the theory and finds that democracies have few militarized interstate disputes causing less than 1,000 battle deaths with one another, that those militarized interstate disputes that have occurred between democracies have caused few deaths and that democracies have few civil wars. There are various criticisms of the theory, including at least as many refutations as alleged proofs of the theory, some 200 deviant cases, failure to treat "democracy" as a multidimensional concept and that correlation is not causation.

Minimization of political violence 
Rudolph Rummel's Power Kills asserts that liberal democracy, among all types of regimes, minimizes political violence and is a method of nonviolence. Rummel attributes this firstly to democracy instilling an attitude of tolerance of differences, an acceptance of losing and a positive outlook towards conciliation and compromise.

A study published by British Academy, on Violence and Democracy, argues that in practice Liberal Democracy has not stopped those running the state from exerting acts of violence both within and outside their borders. The paper also argues that police killings, profiling of racial and religious minorities, online surveillance, data collection, or media censorship are a couple of way in which successful states maintain a monopoly on violence.

Issues and criticism

Dictatorship of the bourgeoisie 

Marxists, communists, as well as some socialists and anarchists argue that liberal democracy under capitalist ideology is constitutively class-based and therefore can never be democratic or participatory. It is referred to as bourgeois democracy because ultimately politicians fight only for the rights of the bourgeoisie.

According to Karl Marx, representation of the interests of different classes is proportional to the influence which a particular class can purchase (through bribes, transmission of propaganda through mass media, economic blackmail, donations for political parties and their campaigns and so on). Thus, the public interest in so-called liberal democracies is systematically corrupted by the wealth of those classes rich enough to gain the appearance of representation. Because of this, multi-party democracies under capitalist ideology are always distorted and anti-democratic, their operation merely furthering the class interests of the owners of the means of production.

The bourgeois class becomes wealthy through a drive to appropriate the surplus-value of the creative labours of the working class. This drive obliges the bourgeois class to amass ever-larger fortunes by increasing the proportion of surplus-value by exploiting the working class through capping workers' terms and conditions as close to poverty levels as possible. Incidentally, this obligation demonstrates the clear limit to bourgeois freedom even for the bourgeoisie itself. Thus, according to Marx parliamentary elections are no more than a cynical, systemic attempt to deceive the people by permitting them, every now and again, to endorse one or other of the bourgeoisie's predetermined choices of which political party can best advocate the interests of capital. Once elected, this parliament, as a dictatorship of the bourgeoisie, enacts regulations that actively support the interests of its true constituency, the bourgeoisie (such as bailing out Wall St investment banks; direct socialisation/subsidisation of business—GMH, US/European agricultural subsidies; and even wars to guarantee trade in commodities such as oil).

Vladimir Lenin once argued that liberal democracy had simply been used to give an illusion of democracy whilst maintaining the dictatorship of the bourgeoisie, giving as an example the United States's representative democracy which he said consisted of "spectacular and meaningless duels between two bourgeois parties" led by "multimillionaires".

Campaign costs 
In Athenian democracy, some public offices were randomly allocated to citizens, in order to inhibit the effects of plutocracy. Aristotle described the law courts in Athens which were selected by lot as democratic and described elections as oligarchic.

The cost of political campaigning in representative democracies favors the rich, a form of plutocracy where only a very small number of wealthy individuals can actually affect government policy in their favor and toward plutonomy.

Other studies predicted that the global trend toward plutonomies would continue, for various reasons, including "capitalist-friendly governments and tax regimes". They do, however, also warn of the risk that, since "political enfranchisement remains as was—one person, one vote, at some point it is likely that labor will fight back against the rising profit share of the rich and there will be a political backlash against the rising wealth of the rich."

Liberal democracy has also been attacked by some socialists as a dishonest farce used to keep the masses from realizing that their will is irrelevant in the political process. Stringent campaign finance laws can correct this perceived problem.

In 2006, United States economist Steven Levitt argues in his book Freakonomics that campaign spending is no guarantee of electoral success. He compared electoral success of the same pair of candidates running against one another repeatedly for the same job, as often happens in United States Congressional elections, where spending levels varied. He concludes:
A winning candidate can cut his spending in half and lose only 1 percent of the vote. Meanwhile, a losing candidate who doubles his spending can expect to shift the vote in his favor by only that same 1 percent.

However, Levitt's response were also criticised as they miss the socialist point of view, which is that citizens who have little to no money at all are blocked from political office entirely. This argument is not refuted merely by noting that either doubling or halving of electoral spending will only shift a given candidate's chances of winning by 1 percent.

On September 18, 2014, Martin Gilens and Benjamin I. Page's study concluded "Multivariate analysis indicates that economic elites and organized groups representing business interests have substantial independent impacts on U.S. government policy, while average citizens and mass-based interest groups have little or no independent influence. The results provide substantial support for theories of Economic-Elite Domination and for theories of Biased Pluralism, but not for theories of Majoritarian Electoral Democracy or Majoritarian Pluralism."

Media 
Critics of the role of the media in liberal democracies allege that concentration of media ownership leads to major distortions of democratic processes. In Manufacturing Consent: The Political Economy of the Mass Media, Edward S. Herman and Noam Chomsky argue via their Propaganda Model that the corporate media limits the availability of contesting views and assert this creates a narrow spectrum of elite opinion. This is a natural consequence, they say, of the close ties between powerful corporations and the media and thus limited and restricted to the explicit views of those who can afford it. Furthermore, the media's negative influence can be seen in social media where vast numbers of individuals seek their political information which is not always correct and may be controlled. For example, as of 2017, two-thirds (67%) of Americans report that they get at least some of their news from social media, as well as a rising number of countries are exercising extreme control over the flow of information. This may contribute to large numbers of individuals using social media platforms but not always gaining correct political information. This may cause conflict with liberal democracy and some of its core principles, such as freedom, if individuals are not entirely free since their governments are seizing that level of control on media sites.

Media commentators also point out that the influential early champions of the media industry held fundamentally anti-democratic views, opposing the general population's involvement in creating policy. Walter Lippmann writing in The Phantom Public (1925) sought to "put the public in its place" so that those in power would be "free of the trampling and roar of a bewildered herd" while Edward Bernays, originator of public relations, sought to "regiment the public mind every bit as much as an army regiments their bodies". Furthermore, the notion that the media is used to indoctrinate the public is also shared by Yascha Mounk's The People Vs Democracy which states that the government benefits from the public having a relatively similar worldview and that this one-minded ideal is one of the principles in which Liberal Democracy stands.

Defenders responding to such arguments assert that constitutionally protected freedom of speech makes it possible for both for-profit and non-profit organisations to debate the issues. They argue that media coverage in democracies simply reflects public preferences and does not entail censorship. Especially with new forms of media such as the Internet, it is not expensive to reach a wide audience, if an interest in the ideas presented exists.

Limited voter turnout 

Low voter turnout, whether the cause is disenchantment, indifference or contentment with the status quo, may be seen as a problem, especially if disproportionate in particular segments of the population. Although turnout levels vary greatly among modern democratic countries and in various types and levels of elections within countries, at some point low turnout may prompt questions as to whether the results reflect the will of the people, whether the causes may be indicative of concerns to the society in question, or in extreme cases the legitimacy of the electoral system.

Get out the vote campaigns, either by governments or private groups, may increase voter turnout, but distinctions must be made between general campaigns to raise the turnout rate and partisan efforts to aid a particular candidate, party or cause.

Several nations have forms of compulsory voting, with various degrees of enforcement. Proponents argue that this increases the legitimacy—and thus also popular acceptance—of the elections and ensures political participation by all those affected by the political process and reduces the costs associated with encouraging voting. Arguments against include restriction of freedom, economic costs of enforcement, increased number of invalid and blank votes and random voting.

Other alternatives include increased use of absentee ballots, or other measures to ease or improve the ability to vote, including electronic voting.

Ethnic and religious conflicts 
For historical reasons, many states are not culturally and ethnically homogeneous. There may be sharp ethnic, linguistic, religious and cultural divisions. In fact, some groups may be actively hostile to each other. A democracy, which by definition allows mass participation in decision-making, theoretically also allows the use of the political process against 'enemy' groups.

The collapse of the Soviet Union and the partial democratisation of Soviet bloc states was followed by wars in the former Yugoslavia, in the Caucasus and in Moldova. Nevertheless, some people believe that the fall of communism and the increase in the number of democratic states were accompanied by a sudden and dramatic decline in total warfare, interstate wars, ethnic wars, revolutionary wars and the number of refugees and displaced people (worldwide, not in the countries of the former sovietic bloc). However, this trend can be attributed to the end of Cold War and the natural exhaustion of said conflicts, many of which were fueled by the Soviet Union and the United States (see also the section below on majoritarianism and democratic peace theory).

In her book World on Fire, Yale Law School professor Amy Chua posits that "when free market democracy is pursued in the presence of a market-dominant minority, the almost invariable result is backlash. This backlash typically takes one of three forms. The first is a backlash against markets, targeting the market-dominant minority's wealth. The second is a backlash against democracy by forces favorable to the market-dominant minority. The third is violence, sometimes genocidal, directed against the market-dominant minority itself".

Bureaucracy 

A persistent libertarian and monarchist critique of democracy is the claim that it encourages the elected representatives to change the law without necessity and in particular to pour forth a flood of new laws (as described in Herbert Spencer's The Man Versus The State). This is seen as pernicious in several ways. New laws constrict the scope of what were previously private liberties. Rapidly changing laws make it difficult for a willing non-specialist to remain law-abiding. This may be an invitation for law-enforcement agencies to misuse power. The claimed continual complication of the law may be contrary to a claimed simple and eternal natural law—although there is no consensus on what this natural law is, even among advocates. Supporters of democracy point to the complex bureaucracy and regulations that has occurred in dictatorships, like many of the former communist states.

The bureaucracy in liberal democracies is often criticised for a claimed slowness and complexity of their decision-making. The term "red tape" is a synonym of slow bureaucratic functioning that hinders quick results in a liberal democracy.

Short-term focus 
By definition, modern liberal democracies allow for regular changes of government. That has led to a common criticism of their short-term focus. In four or five years the government will face a new election and it must think of how it will win that election. That would encourage a preference for policies that will bring short term benefits to the electorate (or to self-interested politicians) before the next election, rather than unpopular policy with longer term benefits. This criticism assumes that it is possible to make long term predictions for a society, something Karl Popper has criticised as historicism.

Besides the regular review of governing entities, short-term focus in a democracy could also be the result of collective short-term thinking. For example, consider a campaign for policies aimed at reducing environmental damage while causing temporary increase in unemployment. However, this risk applies also to other political systems.

Anarcho-capitalist Hans-Herman Hoppe explained short-termism of the democratic governments by the rational choice of currently ruling group to over exploit temporarily accessible resources, thus deriving maximal economic advantage to the members of this group. He contrasted this with hereditary monarchy, in which a monarch has an interest in preserving the long-term capital value of his property (i.e. the country he owns) counterbalancing his desire to extract immediate revenue. He argues that the historical record of levels of taxation in certain monarchies (20–25%) and certain liberal democracies (30–60%) seems to confirm this contention.

Majoritarianism 

The tyranny of the majority is the fear that a direct democratic government, reflecting the majority view, can take action that oppresses a particular minority. For instance, a minority holding wealth, property ownership or power (see Federalist No. 10), or a minority of a certain racial and ethnic origin, class or nationality. Theoretically, the majority is a majority of all citizens. If citizens are not compelled by law to vote, it is usually a majority of those who choose to vote. If such of group constitutes a minority, then it is possible that a minority could in theory oppress another minority in the name of the majority. However, such an argument could apply to both direct democracy or representative democracy. In comparison to a direct democracy where every citizen is forced to vote, under liberal democracies the wealth and power is usually concentrated in the hands of a small privileged class who have significant power over the political process (see inverted totalitarianism). Several de facto dictatorships also have compulsory, but not "free and fair" voting in order to try to increase the legitimacy of the regime, such as North Korea.

Possible examples of a minority being oppressed by or in the name of the majority:
 Those potentially subject to conscription are a minority possibly because of socioeconomic reasons.
 The minority who are wealthy often use their money and influence to manipulate the political process against the interests of the rest of the population, who are the minority in terms of income and access.
 Several European countries have introduced bans on personal religious symbols in state schools. Opponents see this as a violation of rights to freedom of religion and supporters see it as following from the separation of state and religious activities. This may also go as far as restricting religious garments and clothing which may violate the rights of citizens, like in France with the Burqa ban.
 Prohibition of pornography is typically determined by what the majority is prepared to accept.
 The private possession of various weapons (i.e. batons, nunchakus, brass knuckles, pepper spray, firearms and so on) is made legally complicated with background checks and other preventative measures put in place to reduce unnecessary ownership (i.e. the United Kingdom, Belgium and others), with such laws motivated by attempts to increase safety in the society, to reduce general violence, instances of homicide or perhaps by moralism, classism and/or paternalism.
 Recreational drug, caffeine, tobacco, and alcohol use is often criminalised or otherwise suppressed by majorities. In the United States, recreational drug use was popular in the United States throughout most of the 19th century. By century’s end, drug abuse became recognized as a significant social problem and source of concern for the public, which pressured the federal government to intervene legally. Beginning in the late 20th century, American drug policy was criticized for having potentially had racist, classist, religious, or paternalistic origins. Now we see a social shift away from the war on drugs as more and more states look at legalising recreational drugs like marijuana.
 Society's treatment of homosexuals is also cited in this context. Homosexual acts were widely criminalised in democracies until several decades ago and in some democracies like Ghana, Kenya, Tanzania, Tunisia, Nigeria, Malaysia, they still are, reflecting the religious or sexual mores of the majority.
 The Athenian democracy and the early United States had slavery. Even proponents of liberal democracy in European powers, in the 17th and 18th century, were often pro slavery which is contradictory of a liberal democracy. 
 The majority often taxes the minority who are wealthy at progressively higher rates, with the intention that the wealthy will incur a larger tax burden for social purposes.
 In prosperous western representative democracies, the poor form a minority of the population and may not have the power to use the state to initiate redistribution when a majority of the electorate opposes such designs. When the poor form a distinct underclass, the majority may use the democratic process to in effect withdraw the protection of the state.
 An often quoted example of the "tyranny of the majority" is that Adolf Hitler came to power by "legitimate" democratic procedures. The Nazi Party gained the largest share of votes in the democratic Weimar Republic in 1933. Some might consider this an example of "tyranny of a minority" since he never gained a majority vote, but it is common for a plurality to exercise power in democracies, therefore the rise of Hitler cannot be considered irrelevant. However, his regime's large-scale human rights violations took place after the democratic system had been abolished. Furthermore, the Weimar Constitution in an "emergency" allowed dictatorial powers and suspension of the essentials of the constitution itself without any vote or election.

Proponents of democracy make a number of defenses concerning "tyranny of the majority". One is to argue that the presence of a constitution protecting the rights of all citizens in many democratic countries acts as a safeguard. Generally, changes in these constitutions require the agreement of a supermajority of the elected representatives, or require a judge and jury to agree that evidentiary and procedural standards have been fulfilled by the state, or two different votes by the representatives separated by an election, or sometimes a referendum. These requirements are often combined. The separation of powers into legislative branch, executive branch and judicial branch also makes it more difficult for a small majority to impose their will. This means a majority can still legitimately coerce a minority (which is still ethically questionable), but such a minority would be very small and as a practical matter it is harder to get a larger proportion of the people to agree to such actions.

Another argument is that majorities and minorities can take a markedly different shape on different issues. People often agree with the majority view on some issues and agree with a minority view on other issues. One's view may also change, thus the members of a majority may limit oppression of a minority since they may well in the future themselves be in a minority.

A third common argument is that despite the risks majority rule is preferable to other systems and the tyranny of the majority is in any case an improvement on a tyranny of a minority. All the possible problems mentioned above can also occur in non-democracies with the added problem that a minority can oppress the majority. Proponents of democracy argue that empirical statistical evidence strongly shows that more democracy leads to less internal violence and mass murder by the government. This is sometimes formulated as Rummel's Law, which states that the less democratic freedom a people have, the more likely their rulers are to murder them.

Excessive reliance on procedural formalities 
The Chinese Communist Party political concept of whole-process people's democracy criticizes liberal democracy for excessively relying on procedural formalities without genuinely reflecting the interests of the people. Under this primarily consequentialist concept, the most important criteria for a democracy is whether it can "solve the people's real problems," while a system in which "the people are awakened only for voting" is not truly democratic. For example, the Chinese government's 2021 white paper China: Democracy that Works criticizes liberal democracy's shortcoming based on principles of whole process people's democracy.

Vulnerabilities

Authoritarianism

Authoritarianism is perceived by many to be a direct threat to the liberalised democracy practised in many countries. According to American political sociologist and authors Larry Diamond, Marc F. Plattner and Christopher Walker, undemocratic regimes are becoming more assertive. They suggest that liberal democracies introduce more authoritarian measures to counter authoritarianism itself and cite monitoring elections and more control on media in an effort to stop the agenda of undemocratic views. Diamond, Plattner and Walker uses an example of China using aggressive foreign policy against western countries to suggest that a country's society can force another country to behave in a more authoritarian manner. In their book 'Authoritarianism Goes Global: The Challenge to Democracy' they claim that Beijing confronts the United States by building its navy and missile force and promotes the creation of global institutions designed to exclude American and European influence; as such authoritarian states pose a threat to liberal democracy as they seek to remake the world in their own image.

Various authors have also analysed the authoritarian means that are used by liberal democracies to defend economic liberalism and the power of political elites.

War 
There are ongoing debates surrounding the effect that war may have on liberal democracy, and whether it cultivates or inhibits democratization.

War may cultivate democratization by "mobilizing the masses, and creating incentives for the state to bargain with the people it needs to contribute to the war effort". An example of this may be seen in the extension of suffrage in the UK after World War I.

War may however inhibit democratization by "providing an excuse for the curtailment of liberties".

Terrorism 

Several studies have concluded that terrorism is most common in nations with intermediate political freedom, meaning countries transitioning from autocratic governance to democracy. Nations with strong autocratic governments and governments that allow for more political freedom experience less terrorism.

Populism 

There is no one agreed upon definition of populism, with a broader definition settled upon following a conference at the London School of Economics in 1967. Populism academically faces criticism as an ideology with calls from Academics to abandon Populism as a descriptor due to its vagueness. It is typically not fundamentally undemocratic, but it is often anti-liberal. Many will agree on certain features that characterize populism and populists: a conflict between 'the people' and 'the elites', with populists siding with 'the people' and strong disdain for opposition and negative media using labels such as 'fake news'.

Populism is a form of majoritarianism, threatening some of the core principles of liberal democracy such as the rights of the individual. Examples of these can vary from Freedom of movement via control on Immigration, or perhaps opposition to Liberal Social Values such as gay marriage. Populists do this by appealing to the feelings and emotions of the people whilst offering solutions- often vastly simplified- to complex problems.

Populism is a particular threat to the liberal democracy because it exploits the weaknesses of the liberal democratic system. A key weakness of liberal democracies highlighted in 'How Democracies Die', is the conundrum that suppressing populist movements or parties can be seen to be illiberal.

According to Takis Papas in his work Populism and Liberal Democracy: A Comparative and Theoretical Analysis, “democracy has two opposites, one liberal, the other populist”. Whereas liberalism accepts a notion of society composed of multiple divisions, populism only acknowledges a society of ‘the people’ versus ‘the elites’. The fundamental beliefs of the populist voter consist of: the belief that oneself is powerless and is a victim of the powerful; a “sense of enmity” rooted in “moral indignation and resentfulness”; and a “longing for future redemption” through the actions of a charismatic leader. This mindset results in, says Papas, a feeling of victimhood caused by the belief that the society is “made up of victims and perpetrators”. Other characteristic of a populist voter is that they are “distinctively irrational” because of the “disproportionate role of emotions and morality” when making a political decision like voting. Moreover, through self-deception they are “wilfully ignorant”. In addition, they are “intuitively… and unsettlingly principled” rather than a more “pragmatic” liberal voter. 

Another reason why populism is a threat to Liberal Democracy is because it exploits the inherent differences between 'Democracy' and 'Liberalism'. For liberal democracy to be effective, a degree of compromise is required as protecting the rights of the individual take precedence if they are threatened by the will of the majority, more commonly known as a tyranny of the majority. Majoritarianism is so ingrained in the populist ideology that this core value of a liberal democracy is under threat. This therefore brings into question how effectively liberal democracy can defend itself from populism.

Examples of populist movements can include the 2016 Brexit Campaign. The role of the 'elite' in this circumstance was played by the EU and 'London centric Liberals', while the Brexit campaign appealed to Working class industries, such as fighting, agriculture and industrial, who were worse off due to EU Membership. This case study also illustrates the potential threat Populism can pose a Liberal Democracy with the movement heavily relying on disdain for the media. This was done by labeling criticism of Brexit as 'Project Fear'.

See also 

 Constitutional liberalism
 Democratic ideals
 Economic liberalism
 Elective rights
 History of democracy
 Illiberal democracy
 Index of politics articles
 Jeffersonian democracy
 Neoliberalism
 Republicanism
 Social democracy
 Social liberalism

Notes

References

Further reading 

 Ghasemi, Mehdi. “Paradigms of Postmodern Democracy.” SAGE Open, 2019, April–June: 1–6.
 Haas, Michael (2014). Deconstructing the 'Democratic Peace': How a Research Agenda Boomeranged. Los Angeles, CA: Publishinghouse for Scholars. 
 Willard, Charles Arthur (1996). Liberalism and the Problem of Knowledge: A New Rhetoric for Modern Democracy. University of Chicago Press. .  .

Democracy
Types of democracy